Aspira may refer to:

 ASPIRA Association - an American educational organization.
 Aspira (building) - a building in Seattle, Washington.